Bina Singh is an Indian politician, currently a member of Rashtriya Janata Dal and a Member of Bihar Legislative Assembly from Mahnar. She is the wife of former Member of Parliament, Rama Kishore Singh. She defeated the Janata Dal (United) state president Umesh Singh Kushwaha in 2020 Bihar Legislative Assembly election.

References 

Living people
Rashtriya Janata Dal politicians
Bihar MLAs 2020–2025
1960 births